Kulal may refer to:
 Mount Kulal, Kenya
 Kulal, Iran, a village in Bushehr Province, Iran